Harry Gwala Stadium is a multi-use stadium in Pietermaritzburg, South Africa.  It is currently used mostly for football matches and is the home ground of Premier Soccer League club Maritzburg United.

In 2008 the stadium had a capacity of 10,000, but around September 2009 it was upgraded to 12,000 seats. The reason for this, was an urgent need for more high capacity stadiums in the region, particular being requested as part of the upcoming 2010 FIFA World Cup. The stadium, was initially planned to be able to seat 20,000 supporters, but the municipality revealed, that with the funds at their disposal, the stadium will have a capacity of just 12,000.

The stadium is named after ANC politician Harry Gwala.

References

External links
Soccerway info about Harry Gwala Stadium
Harry Gwala Stadium picture

Maritzburg United F.C.
Soccer venues in South Africa
Buildings and structures in Pietermaritzburg
Sports venues in KwaZulu-Natal